Henri Bachelin (27 March 1879 – 21 September 1941) was a 20th-century French writer

Biography 
After studying at the seminary of Nevers, followed by four years in the army, he practiced the profession of bank clerk, which he abandoned in 1911 to devote himself exclusively to literature. He published about forty books, mostly novels and short stories, but also works of literary criticism and musicology. These are works centered on the painting of provincial life, like Sous d'humbles toits, Juliette la jolie or Le Village, where he depicts the countryside and villages of the Morvan with great realism. He was also the author of historical novels (L'Abbaye-Vézelay au XIIe siècle, La mort de Bibracte), novels of manners (Le Péché de la Vierge, La Vénus rustique) and training novels fed with autobiographical elements (L'Héritage, Le Chant du coq). He was awarded the prix Femina in 1918 for Le Serviteur, in which he pays homage to his father.

His interest in religious music was reflected in a novel (Les Grandes Orgues) and by a theoretical reference work (L'Orgue, ses éléments, son histoire, son esthétique) written in collaboration with Alexandre Eugène Cellier. In 1925 he was commissioned to prepare the edition of the "Journal" of Jules Renard, of which he had been a friend and a disciple at the beginning. He collaborated with numerous journals such as the Mercure de France and the NRF.

Although he went to Paris, where he frequented Charles-Louis Philippe, André Gide and Paul Léautaud, he was still very attached to his small native town. Lormes built a bust in his memory in front of the house where he spent his childhood. He left several unpublished manuscripts. The first volume of his "Journal" (written from 1926 to 1941) was published in 2009.

Works 
Poetry
1904: Horizons et coins du Morvan, Paris
Tales and short stories
1906: Pas-comme-les-autres
1907: Les Manigants
1910: Robes noires
1911: Les Sports aux champs
1913: Sous d'humbles toits
1917: La Guerre sur le hameau
1920: Sous les marronniers en fleurs
1999: Vieilles images d'un canton de France
Novels
1910: La Bancale
1912: Juliette la jolie
1914: L'Héritage
1918: Le Serviteur, Prix Femina
1918: L'Eclaircie
1919: Le Village, Prix Jean Revel
1919: Le Petit
1920: Le Bélier, la brebis et le mouton
1922: Les Rustres
1923: Le Chant du coq
1914: Le Péché de la Vierge
1925: Les Grandes Orgues
1925: La Cornemuse de Saulieu
1926: La Vénus rustique
1926: Dondon Juan
1927: La maison d'Annike
1927: Le Taureau et les bœufs
1927: L'Abbaye - Vézelay au XIIe siècle
1928: L'Eté de la Saint Martin
1929: L'Orage d'hiver
1930: La mort de Bibracte
1931: Le Sergent Valentin
1937: Monsieur Ildefonse
1938: Le Sabreur
1981: Les Parsonniers
Literary studies
1909: Jules Renard et son œuvre
1909: Gustave Flaubert
1926: J.-K. Huysmans. Du naturalisme littéraire au naturalisme mystique
1929: Charles-Louis Philippe. Son œuvre
1930: Jules Renard (1864–1910). Son œuvre
1945: Nos paysans d'après Jules Renard, précédé de Jules Renard en Nivernais
Musicology
1927: Les noëls français
1930: Les Maîtrises et la musique de chœur
1933: L'Orgue. Ses éléments, son histoire, son esthétique (in collab. with Alexandre Cellier)
Trivia
1941: P.-J. Proudhon, socialiste national (1809–1865)
1944: Collines et buttes parisiennes
1994: Correspondances avec André Gide et Romain Rolland
2009: Journal - tome I - 1926-1929 (éditions du Pas de l'Âne, Autun)

Bibliography 
 Jules Bertaut, Le roman nouveau (Paris, Renaissance du Livre, 1920)
 André Billy, La terrasse du Luxembourg (Paris, Arthème Fayard, 1945)
 , Pages choisies d'Henri Bachelin (Moulins, Crépin-Leblond, 1948)
 René Dumesnil, Préface à l'édition définitive du Serviteur (Mercure de France, 1944)
 , Henri Bachelin : l’éveil, la réussite, l’isolement (Vents du Morvan, n°32, summer 2009)
 , Henri Bachelin, poète et romancier du Morvan (lecture given in 1943 and published in L'Horizon de pourpre, n°18, 2000)
 André Pasquet, Deux romanciers morvandiaux : Henri Bachelin - Le marquis de Montmorillon (Autun, Impr. Taverne & Chandioux, 1939)
 , Henri Bachelin ou le triomphe de l'oubli (Académie du Morvan, n°14, 1981)
 Jean-François Vacquer, À la découverte d'Henri Bachelin (Association H. Bachelin, 1996)
 Jean-François Vacquer, Le Morvan vu par Henri Bachelin (Académie du Morvan, n° 46-47, 1999)
 L'Horizon de pourpre, bulletin semestriel de l'Association Henri Bachelin (50 issues published from 1991 to 2016).

External links 
 Henri Bacheli, l’éveil, la réussite, l’isolement on Association Henri Bachelin
 Le Morvan vu par Henri Bachelin on Académie du Morvan
 Promenade à la découverte d'Henri Bachelin, à Lormes, dans la Nièvre

1879 births
People from Nièvre
1941 deaths
20th-century French male writers
20th-century French novelists
French male short story writers
French short story writers
Prix Femina winners